Repnyakovskaya is a rural locality (a village) in Yavengskoye Rural Settlement, Vozhegodsky District, Vologda Oblast, Russia. The population was 31 as of 2002.

Geography 
Repnyakovskaya is located 27 km northeast of Vozhega (the district's administrative centre) by road. Okulovskaya is the nearest rural locality.

References 

Rural localities in Vozhegodsky District